Chedun is a railway station on the Jinshan railway in Songjiang District, Shanghai. It opened for intercity passenger service on September 28, 2012.

References 

Stations on the Jinshan railway
Railway stations in Shanghai
Railway stations in China opened in 2012